Elizabeth Maitland, Duchess of Lauderdale, 2nd Countess of Dysart (née Murray; 28 September 1626 – 5 June 1698) was a Scottish noblewoman. In her own right she was the Countess of Dysart and from the date of her remarriage in 1672 the Duchess of Lauderdale. She was famous for the political influence she held, which was unusual for women of the period, and for her support for Charles II during his exile, as a member of the secret organisation known as the Sealed Knot.

Early life
Murray was the eldest of the four daughters of William Murray, 1st Earl of Dysart, a close friend and Gentleman of the Bedchamber of Charles I; and his wife Catherine Bruce. Her birth was recorded in the baptismal register at St. Martin-in-the-Fields in 1626. During that same year, her parents moved to Ham House, where she spent her childhood. Her father ensured that she received a full education, which was unusual for women of the period, while her mother ensured she was prepared to run a household efficiently.

English Civil War and first marriage
During the English Civil War, Elizabeth's father was often away from the family in service to the king. Her mother took the opportunity to travel along the Thames to the court at Oxford, including the winter of 1643-44. She developed a reputation for charisma and beauty, being described by Thomas Knyvett as "...a pretty witty Lass." After some years of searching for a suitable match, she married Sir Lionel Tollemachein 1648, a prudent choice given his lack of political involvement, but one that created a stable marriage. The following year, Ham House was placed in the hands of trustees administered by Lionel, to help secure the estate from the threat of sequestration. 

At the start of their marriage, Sir Lionel and Lady Dysart lived at Fakenham Magna in Suffolk, a wooded countryside near his family estate at Helmingham Hall and removed from much of the upheaval of war. They had eleven children, five of whom survived to adulthood:

 Lionel Tollemache, 3rd Earl of Dysart, his eldest son, inherited the Earldom of Dysart on his mother's death in 1698.
 Thomas Tollemache, Lieutenant-General, abandoned the family's devotion to the House of Stuart and became a key supporter of William of Orange (later King William III of England).
 Elizabeth Tollemache (1659–1735) married Archibald Campbell, 1st Duke of Argyll.
 William Tollemache (1661–1694) was a captain in the Royal Navy.
 Catherine Tollemache married James Stewart, Lord Doune and secondly John Gordon, 16th Earl of Sutherland.

Elizabeth did not want a quiet domestic life and often based herself at her family home, Ham House near Richmond by the Thames after her mother's death in 1649. She became acquainted with the Parliamentarian Oliver Cromwell, likely when his army headquarters were located in nearby Kingston-upon-Thames in the summer of 1647, and the connection provided a cover for her own Royalist tendencies. She also used that friendship to successfully plead for the life of John Maitland, the royalist Earl of Lauderdale after his capture at the Battle of Worcester. In 1653 she joined the secret Royalist organisation, the Sealed Knot. She was in correspondence with exiled supporters of Charles II and even visited Europe on multiple occasions to convey letters to the king. Her dedication to the cause also led her to develop a type of invisible ink to be used for secret correspondence.

Upon her father's death in 1655 she inherited his titles, becoming  suo jure Countess of Dysart and Lady Huntingtower. In September 1658 one of her neighbours, Judith Isham, joked about her new title, writing that people "call her my Lady Dessert, she is soe takeing, expressing extraordinary sivility to every person". A few years later, she wrote to her kinsman Sir Robert Moray to help her trace her family lineage in order to complete the settlement of her family coat of arms. The result was a pedigree which allowed her to trace her ancestry back to King James II of Scotland. Her title as Countess of Dysart was secured by the grant of new Letters Patent on 5 December 1670, which also granted the ability for female heirs to inherit the title where no male heir existed.

In 1660, when Charles II resumed the throne, he rewarded Elizabeth with an annual pension of £800. She and her husband were also granted the freehold of 75 acres surrounding Ham House in recognition of "the service done by the late Earl of Dysart and his daughter." Her enemies accused her of witchcraft because of her political influence and was subject to unfounded accusations of having had a liaison with Cromwell.

Second marriage

In 1669 her husband Lionel died in France and Elizabeth became the sole owner of Ham House, along with other properties including Framsden Hall in Suffolk. Soon after his death she became the mistress of John Maitland, 1st Duke of Lauderdale, the Scottish noble and politician, and became involved in the intrigues and power struggles of the Restoration court through her influence upon him, as well as other Scottish aristocrats such as William, Duke of Hamilton. Elizabeth and John married in February 1672, after the death of his estranged first wife Lady Anne Home in December 1671. He received a dukedom in May 1672, which then made Elizabeth the Duchess of Lauderdale. He was a member of the Cabal Ministry of Charles II and had been appointed both Secretary of State and High Commissioner for Scotland. A month after their marriage, they traveled north to Scotland for the opening of Parliament where, in defiance of tradition, Elizabeth decided to accompany her husband. Her insistence on chairs for herself and her ladies-in-waiting was the source of comment and condemnation. The pair became known for their influence, wealth and extravagance.

In January 1671 she wrote to her cousin the Scottish architect William Bruce seeking advice for a new gateway to the forecourt of Ham House in preparation for a planned visit by Charles II and his wife, Queen Catherine of Braganza. Bruce offered to send her a sketch for the piers that would be an improvement on a design supplied by her mason, John Lampen, with Scottish stone supplied by Robert Mylne. After some delay, the iron gates were made in England by Edward Harris and painted blue with smalt. She quarrelled with Bruce over further works, and in 1674 wrote to a mutual cousin the Earl of Kincardine, "the insolence of that creature is insufferable."

In 1673, she and her husband initiated a series of alterations to Ham House to enlarge and modernise the property according to the latest style. The infill of the southern face of the house enabled the creation of both royal chambers on the first floor, as well as separate apartments for the Duke and Duchess on the ground floor. Shortly after the completion of the apartments, Elizabeth commissioned the creation of a bathroom in the basement of the home, one of the earliest in 17th century England.

Later life
In early 1680, Elizabeth suffered a severe attack of gout which affected her health for the rest of her life. In the same year, John's health also deteriorated after suffering a stroke as well as bouts of scurvy and bladder stones. He resigned his government positions in September 1680, as which point Elizabeth nursed him at Ham House. After his death in April 1682 Elizabeth entered into a legal dispute with her brother-in-law Lord Tweedale over her late husband's debts and funeral expenses. Tweedale had insisted on an ostentatious burial for his brother and subsequently sent the bill to Elizabeth, which triggered a dispute that persisted into the following decade.

The Duke had mortgaged Ham House to fund the renovation of his Scottish properties (especially his favoured residence Thirlestane Castle), which had now been settled upon Lord Tweedale in the late Duke's will, while Ham House had been returned to Elizabeth. The Duchess sold some of her jewels as well as part of the late Duke's book collection to cover the interest on the mortgages. Despite the efforts of Lord Tweedale's son and even James II, the dispute persisted until being settled in the Scottish courts in June 1688, who required Lord Tweedale to cover the debts, while assigning Elizabeth the responsibility for the funeral expenses.

Death and burial

Elizabeth had suffered from gout for many years, and her mobility became limited until she was largely confined to the ground floor at Ham House. Despite that she maintained a brisk correspondence with friends and family, keenly interested in the news from Court. In 1694 she suffered the loss of her sons Thomas and William.

The Duchess of Lauderdale died at the age of 72 on 5 June 1698 at Ham House. She is buried, according to her wishes, with other members of the Dysart family in a vault under the chancel of Petersham Parish Church.

In literature and art
Elizabeth Murray was first described in popular literature in the 1975 book by Doreen Cripps, Elizabeth of the Sealed Knot. She is also the subject of the novel Royalist Rebel, by Anita Seymour published by Claymore Books in 2013.

Notes

References

Sources

1626 births
1698 deaths
Burials at St Peter's, Petersham
People from Richmond, London
Tollemache, Elizabeth 2nd Countess of Dysart
Dysart, Elizabeth Tollemache 2nd Countess of
Elizabeth Murray
17th-century Scottish women
Dysart
British duchesses by marriage
Wives of knights
17th-century spies